Loris Cresson (born 14 August 1998) is a Belgian motorcycle racer. In 2022 FIM Endurance World Championship he rides for team BMRT 3D Maxxess Devers in the Superstock class.

Career statistics

Grand Prix motorcycle racing

By season

Races by year
(key) (Races in bold indicate pole position; races in italics indicate fastest lap)

Supersport World Championship

Races by year
(key) (Races in bold indicate pole position; races in italics indicate fastest lap)

Superbike World Championship

Races by year
(key) (Races in bold indicate pole position, races in italics indicate fastest lap)

References

External links

Belgian motorcycle racers
Living people
1998 births
Moto3 World Championship riders
Supersport World Championship riders
Superbike World Championship riders
People from Braine-l'Alleud
Sportspeople from Walloon Brabant